Matías Cabrera (born 16 May 1986) is a Uruguayan footballer who plays as a midfielder. He currently plays for CA Cerro. He is most noticed for his accurate passing, marking and defensive plays recovering the ball for his teammates.

Honours

Cerro
Liguilla Pre-Libertadores: Champion 2009

Nacional
Primera División Uruguaya: 2010–11 and 2011–12

References 

1986 births
Living people
Uruguayan footballers
Uruguayan expatriate footballers
Association football midfielders
Uruguayan Primera División players
Chilean Primera División players
Serie A players
Club Nacional de Football players
Cagliari Calcio players
Primeira Liga players
G.D. Estoril Praia players
Defensor Sporting players
Universidad de Concepción footballers
Uruguayan expatriate sportspeople in Italy
Expatriate footballers in Italy
Uruguayan expatriate sportspeople in Portugal
Expatriate footballers in Portugal
Expatriate footballers in Chile